Archibald William Montgomerie, 14th Earl of Eglinton, DL (3 December 1841 – 30 August 1892) was a Scottish nobleman and member of the House of Lords.

Eglinton was a Deputy Lieutenant of Lanarkshire and Ayrshire. He succeeded to the titles on the death of his father on 4 October 1861.

Family
Lord Eglinton married Lady Sophia Anderson-Pelham, daughter of the 2nd Earl of Yarborough. They had four daughters. Eglinton died on 30 August 1892, aged 50.

Citations

References

External links
 

14
1841 births
1892 deaths
Deputy Lieutenants of Ayrshire
Deputy Lieutenants of Lanarkshire
Place of birth missing
Clan Montgomery